The TM-41 was a circular, metal-cased Soviet anti-tank landmine used during the Second World War. The mines case consisted of a short cylinder with the entire top surface being used as a pressure plate. The mine has a carrying handle on the side of the mine. It was normally painted olive drab and was broadly similar to the larger, later, TM-44 mine.

The mine could be waterproofed with washers and laid underwater, where it can remain operational for two months.

Pressure on the pressure plate resulted in lock balls being force out of position, releasing a striker, which triggers a detonator, then a booster and then the mines main charge.

The mine was used with anti-handling devices.

A Chinese copy of the mine was also produced.

Specifications
 Diameter: 254 mm
 Height: 140 mm
 Weight: 5.4 kg
 Explosive content: 3.9 kg of Amatol or TNT
 Activation pressure: 160 kg

References

 TM 5-223,Foreign Mine Warfare Equipment
 

Anti-tank mines